Vadapathy is a village in the Papanasam taluk of Thanjavur district, Tamil Nadu, India.

Demographics 

As per the 2001 census, Vadapathy had a total population of 1685 with 828 males and 857 females. The sex ratio was 1035. The literacy rate was 68.49.

References 

 

Villages in Thanjavur district